César E. Trasobares (born 1949 in Holguín, Cuba), is a Cuban-American artist specializing in Collage, Installation, and Performance.

From 1965 to 1996 he resided in Mexico and Miami. Since 1996 he has resided in New York City. In 1970 he studied in the Miami Dade Community College, Associate of Arts, in Miami, Florida. He is a graduate of Florida Atlantic University (Bachelor of Arts), Florida.

Individual exhibitions
In 1978, he had an exhibition, New Paintings, in the Forma Gallery, Coral Gables, Florida. In 1979, he presented Rosata Quinceañera, Debutanta Glorificata in the Cayman Gallery, New York. In 1991, he exhibited Recent Rings and other Circles in the Barbara Gillman Gallery, Miami. In 1996, he presented Body of Work in the Ambrosino Gallery, Coral Gables, Florida.

Collective exhibitions
In 1976, his work was seen at the 38th Annual Exhibition of Contemporary American Painting, at the Society of the Four Arts, in Palm Beach, Florida. In 1991 he was included in Collage Unglued show at the Center of Contemporary Art (COCA), Miami. In 1993 he participated in Southern Roots. South Florida Invitational at the Museum of Art, Fort Lauderdale. In 1995, he was one of the selected artists to display at To Collect, Conserve, Exhibit and Interpret the Visual Arts Produced by Artists of Cuban Heritage. The New Collection I at the Museo Cubano de Arte y Cultura, in Miami.

Awards
Trasobares won the National Endowment for the Arts Fellowship, Washington, D.C., in 1979 and in 1980, he obtained the Cintas Foundation Fellowship for Art, 1980–81, New York City.

Collections
His work can be found in collections such as the Lowe Art Museum, University of Miami, Coral Gables, and in the Metropolitan Museum and Art Center, Coral Gables.

References and external links
 https://web.archive.org/web/20110116033121/http://www.cintasfoundation.org/fellows_artists_t.htm

Cuban contemporary artists
1949 births
Living people